Hyundai H-1 is a nameplate of a van and pickup truck used by Hyundai Motor Company in European export markets for three related models:

 Hyundai Starex, (called i800 in Europe and H-200 in the Netherlands) a minibus/van
 Hyundai Libero, a pickup truck

All-wheel-drive vehicles
H-1
Hyundai vehicles
Minibuses
Pickup trucks
Rear-wheel-drive vehicles
Vans